Dario Montani (born 27 March 1961) is an Italian former professional racing cyclist. He rode in the 1987 Tour de France.

References

External links

1961 births
Living people
Italian male cyclists
Sportspeople from Walsall